Samuel Stewart (31 January 1912 – 19 September 1950) was an American fencer. He competed in the team sabre event at the 1936 Summer Olympics.

References

External links
 

1912 births
1950 deaths
American male sabre fencers
Olympic fencers of the United States
Fencers at the 1936 Summer Olympics
Sportspeople from New York City